Dead Dawn is the second studio album by Swedish death metal band Entombed A.D. It was released on 16 February 2016 through Century Media Records.

Track listing

Personnel

Entombed A.D.
Nico Elgstrand - Guitars, Vocals
Olle Dahlstedt - Drums
Lars-Göran Petrov - Vocals
Victor Brandt - Bass, Vocals

Guest musician
Anders Wikström - Backing vocals (tracks 3, 4)

Production
Tom van Heesch - Recording, Mixing, Co-Producer (tracks 3, 4, 6)
Jacob Hellner - Producer (tracks 3, 4, 6)
Erik Danielsson, Trident Arts - Artwork
Sara Gewalt - Photography
Nico Elgstrand - Recording, Producer (tracks 1, 2, 5, 7-10)
Svante Forsbäck - Mastering
Carsten Drescher - Layout

References 

2016 albums
Century Media Records albums